2020 census may refer to:

 2020 Chinese census
 2020 Indonesian census
 2020 Philippine census
 2020 Turkish census
 2020 United States census
 Russian Census (2020)

See also
 Census
 Census bureau
 Head count (disambiguation)
 Per capita